Northern Lights was an American progressive bluegrass band formed in 1975 in New England, which musical career spanned more than three decades. Known for a progressive style of bluegrass playing, the band went through a number of line-up changes through the years and included such personalities as Alison Brown or multiinstrumentalist Jake Armerding, son of founding member Taylor Armerding, who started playing with the band full-time at age of 14, but played occasionally when he was 12. As of 2009, there is no founding member left in the group. Guitarist Bill Henry, who joined the band in 1982 assumed the leadership role and Northern Lights continue to play without interruption as a quintet, consisting of two generation of musicians - Bill Henry, John Daniel and Alex MacLeod as well as young players Eric Robertson and Mike Barnett. 
The band has issued 10 studio and 1 live recording with Vassar Clemonts. Most of which are, unfortunately, out of print today. From 1990's "Take You to the Sky," to recently released One Day(Fifty-Fifty Music), the band has fused an eclectic mix of traditional roots music, rock, country, soul and gospel with the high, lonesome vocal sound and instruments of bluegrass. Three of their records also reached the top ten of Bluegrass Unlimited's National Bluegrass Survey.

History
The Northern Lights began its history in 1975, when Bob Emery, Marty Sachs and Dan Marcus  asked mandolinist Taylor Armerding to join them in their progressive bluegrass efforts. This line-up recorded their first self-titled album in 1976, however, the group split in 1977. After five years, they re-formed again, at the urging of Joe Val, Taylor contacted banjoist Alison Brown. She remained in the Northern Lights lineup for the next two years.
After Allison moved back to California in 1986, banjoist Mike Kropp took her spot to remain with the band for the next 17 years. Around this time, the band started to enjoy more recognition as a strong progressive bluegrass band, playing in different festivals together with well-known artists such as Tony Rice, Mark O'Connor, Jerry Douglas or Peter Rowan. This would help the band to sign with Flying Fish Records and record their next three CD's under this label.

Most part of its history Northern Lights performed as a quartet and hired guest fiddlers such as Alison Krauss, Matt Glaser or Vassar Clements. Jake Armerding, son of band's mandolinist Taylor, started to play with the band occasionally at the age of 12 (in 1990), joining the band full-time 2 years later. The band recorded their two highly acclaimed records with Jake, Wrong Highway Blues in 1994 and Living in the City in 1996. A review of Living in  the City in the Toronto Star labeled the group "the finest  of modern bluegrass groups". Jake left in 1999 to pursue his own music, as well as Mike Kropp in 2000 and Taylor Armerding in 2003. These have been the most significant changes to the band line-up so far. Bill Henry took over the lead role and the band recorded New Moon and their latest album, One Day in 2008.

.

Disbandment

After some three decades of bringing bluegrass to the Northeast and beyond, Northern Lights decided to close up shop. Band's last official show was at the Rose Garden in Mansfield, MA on March 13.
Several NL alumni were on hand there to help us celebrate the end of a New England institution, including Taylor Armerding, Mike Kropp, Jeff Horton and Dave Dick.

Discography 

Recorded under Revonah Records:
Northern Lights (1976)
Before the Fire Comes Down(1983)
On the Edge (1987)
Recorded under Flying Fish Records
Take You to the Sky (1990)
Can't Buy Your Way (1992)
Wrong Highway Blues (1994)
Recorded under Red House Records
Living in the City (1996)
Recorded under Prime CD Records
Three August Nights (2000)
Another Sleepless Night (2001)
Recorded under Fifty Fifty Music Music
New Moon (2005)
One Day (2008)

Band lineups

Northern Lights timeline

References

External links
 (Official site) Closed
 (Group management, concerts booking) Closed

American bluegrass music groups
Red House Records artists
Flying Fish Records artists
Progressive bluegrass music groups